Kate Micucci (born March 31, 1980) is an American actress, comedian, and musician who is half of the musical comedy duo Garfunkel and Oates. Some of her roles include Stephanie Gooch in Scrubs, Ally in 'Til Death, Shelley in Raising Hope, Lucy in The Big Bang Theory, Sadie Miller in Steven Universe, Sara Murphy in Milo Murphy's Law, Daisy in Nature Cat, Clayface in The Lego Batman Movie, Velma Dinkley in Scooby-Doo since 2015, Webby Vanderquack in DuckTales,  and Dr. Fox in Unikitty!

Early life and education
Micucci was born in Jersey City, New Jersey to a family of Italian descent. She grew up in Nazareth, Pennsylvania in the Lehigh Valley region of eastern Pennsylvania and was raised as a Catholic. She learned to play classical piano from her mother. 

Micucci graduated from Nazareth Area High School in 1998. She received an A.A. in fine arts from Keystone College in La Plume, Pennsylvania and a B.A. in studio art from Loyola Marymount University in Los Angeles in 2003.

Career

Micucci's television credits include numerous television commercials and acting roles, including Toni the barista on NBC's Four Kings, guest roles on Malcolm in the Middle, 'Til Death, How I Met Your Mother, Cory in the House, The Big Bang Theory, and Campus Ladies, and recurring roles on Scrubs and Raising Hope. Her film credits include The Last Hurrah, Bart Got a Room, and When in Rome. She played Lily the IT girl on Elevator, produced by HBO's Runawaybox. In early 2009, she released a five-track EP entitled Songs.

Micucci appeared in five episodes of Scrubs ("My Lawyer's in Love", "My Absence", "My Chief Concern", "Our Histories", and "My Finale") as Stephanie Gooch, a ukulele player with whom Ted Buckland begins a relationship. She performs her song "Mr. Moon" and an adapted version of "Fuck You" (retitled "Screw You" for ABC), a song she typically performs as part of the musical duo Garfunkel and Oates. In 2009, she starred in the short film Imaginary Larry, co-written and co-directed by Riki Lindhome, her partner in Garfunkel and Oates. In August 2009, Micucci appeared in an advertising campaign for Hillshire Farms and for H & R Block in January 2010.

In 2010, Micucci appeared in the Kristen Bell film When in Rome and in an episode in the sixth season of the TV show Weeds as a slightly sedated waitress. She appeared in some episodes of the HBO series Bored to Death and appeared as Shelley on series Raising Hope. Micucci was originally cast as Jimmy's cousin in the pilot that was filmed December 2009. Her role was recast by Skyler Stone as Mike, changing the character Micucci originated from Jimmy's cousin to Sabrina's cousin, Shelley.

From 2009 to October 2011, she performed "Playin' with Micucci" on the third Monday of the month at The Steve Allen Theater in Hollywood, California. In the act, she presented "songs and stories in [a] musical variety show." Micucci said the title was the only dirty aspect of the show. She frequently performed (as "Oates") with Lindhome (as "Garfunkel") in "An Evening with Garfunkel and Oates" at the Upright Citizens Brigade Theater in Los Angeles. She performed with William H. Macy on the ukulele to promote the DVD release of the film Bart Got a Room.  The video has been circulated around the Internet on sites such as YouTube and The Huffington Post.

In February 2011, Micucci appeared briefly in a Progressive Insurance ad as a waitress. She has voiced a character on Pendleton Ward's animated series Adventure Time, and as the character of Julie Kane on the Disney XD animated series Motorcity. She voiced the recurring character Sadie Miller on the Cartoon Network animated series Steven Universe. In July 2012, Kate appeared in Written by a Kid's production Scary Smash, a Geek and Sundry creation that was executive produced by Kim Evey, Felicia Day, and Sheri Byrant.

In January 2013, Micucci's casting was announced for a recurring role on The Big Bang Theory as "a potential love interest for ... Raj." Her character, the painfully shy Lucy, first appeared on February 14, 2013. Micucci appeared as a guest judge on King of the Nerds.

Since October 2015, Micucci has provided the voice of Velma Dinkley in various Scooby-Doo franchise projects, beginning with the animated television series Be Cool, Scooby-Doo!.

In 2016, she co-starred in a season one episode of the Netflix comedy-drama series Easy, reprising her role for the series' second and third seasons. Micucci voiced Webby Vanderquack in the 2017 reboot of DuckTales.

Personal life
Micucci married musician and recording producer Jake Sinclair in February 2018. They live in Los Angeles and New York. She gave birth to their son in January 2020.

Her brother, Matt Micucci, is also an actor.

Discography

EPs

Singles

Guest appearances

As part of Garfunkel and Oates

Studio albums
 All Over Your Face (2011)
 Slippery When Moist (2012)
 Secretions (2015)

EPs
 Music Songs (2009)

Filmography

Awards
On December 30, 2009, G4TV named Micucci the #1 Woman of Comedy.

References

External links

 
 

 

1980 births
Living people
21st-century American actresses
21st-century American comedians
Actresses from Los Angeles
Actresses from New Jersey
Actresses from Pennsylvania
American comedy musicians
American film actresses
American people of Italian descent
American television actresses
American ukulele players
American voice actresses
American women comedians
Comedians from California
Keystone College alumni
Loyola Marymount University alumni
Musicians from Los Angeles
Musicians from New Jersey
Musicians from Pennsylvania
Nazareth Area High School alumni
People from Jersey City, New Jersey
People from Northampton County, Pennsylvania